Noon is the time 12 o'clock midday.

Noon may refer to:

Geography 
 Noon, Oregon, an unincorporated community in Benton County, Oregon, United States
 Noon, Washington , an unincorporated community in Whatcom County, Washington, United States

People 
 Noon (surname)
 Noon (musician) (b. 1979), pseudonym of Polish electronic musician and producer Mikołaj Bugajak
 Serer-Noon, an ethnic group of western Senegal

People with the surname Noon:
 Carole C. Noon, American primatologist 
 Colin Noon, rugby union footballer for Leeds Tykes
 David Noon (born 1946), American composer
 Ed Noon, character in Michael Avallone's novels
 Frank Noon, Def Leppard's second drummer
 Gladys Noon Spellman, U.S. Congresswoman
 Jamie Noon, English rugby union player
 Jeff Noon (born 1957), English science fiction author
 Mark Noon, semi-professional English football player
 Micky Noon, professional English football player
 Steve Noon, British artist
 Thomas Noon Talfourd, English judge and author
 Vicki Noon, American theater performer
 Wayne Noon, English cricketer
 Will Noon, drummer of Straylight Run and the former drummer of Breaking Pangaea

People from Pakistan and India 
 Gulam Noon, Baron Noon, British businessman originally from India
 Feroz Khan Noon, politician and former 7th prime minister of Pakistan, from Sargodha District
 Malik Adnan Hayat Noon, politician in Pakistan and member of the Noon family of Pakistan
 Malik Amjad Ali Noon, Pakistani politician
 Malik Anwer Ali Noon, politician and Landlord of Sargodha in the Noon family
 Noon Meem Danish, Pakistani poet of African and Baloch descent
 Noon Meem Rashid, Pakistani poet of modern Urdu poetry
 Viqar un Nisa Noon, wife of the 7th Prime Minister of Pakistan, Feroz Khan Noon

Arts, entertainment, and media
 Noon (film), 1968 Yugoslav film directed by Mladomir Puriša Đorđević
 Noon (magazine), an annual literary magazine
 Noon (play), a one-act play by Terrence McNally
 Symphony No. 7 (Haydn) by Haydn, nicknamed "Le midi", meaning "The Noon"

Other uses
 Noon language, language spoken by the Serer-Noon people of Senegal
 NOON state, an entangled quantum mechanical state
 Nun (letter) (or Noon) is the fourteenth letter of many Semitic abjads

See also 
 High Noon (disambiguation)
 Noonday (disambiguation)
 Noone